Gleneagle is an unincorporated community and a census-designated place (CDP) located in and governed by El Paso County, Colorado, United States. The CDP is a part of the Colorado Springs, CO Metropolitan Statistical Area. The population of the Gleneagle CDP was 6,611 at the United States Census 2010. The Colorado Springs post office (Zip Code 80921) serves the area.

Geography

Demographics

Politics
In the Colorado General Assembly Gleneagle is located in the 4th Senate District, represented by Republican Jim Smallwood, and in the 20th House District, represented by Republican Terri Carver. Federally, Gleneagle is located in Colorado's 5th congressional district, which has a Cook PVI of R +14 and is represented by Republican Doug Lamborn.

Media

Gleneagle is served by Colorado Springs radio and television stations.

Newspapers
The Gazette (Colorado Springs)
The Tri-Lakes Tribune

See also

Outline of Colorado
Index of Colorado-related articles
State of Colorado
Colorado cities and towns
Colorado census designated places
Colorado counties
El Paso County, Colorado
List of statistical areas in Colorado
Front Range Urban Corridor
South Central Colorado Urban Area
Colorado Springs, CO Metropolitan Statistical Area

References

External links

El Paso County website

Census-designated places in El Paso County, Colorado
Census-designated places in Colorado